Pravdino is a settlement on the Karelian Isthmus, in Vyborgsky District of Leningrad Oblast. Until the Winter War and the Continuation War, it had been the administrative center of the Muolaa municipality of the Viipuri Province of Finland.

Before the Winter War Muolaa was divided into two separate municipalities, Äyräpää and Muolaa.

In Pravdino was once the State demesne and manor of Målagård, place of origin and seat 1606-1704 for the Swedish noble family Hästesko af Målagård, ennobled in 1602.  It is unknown whether anything today remains of Målagård. The noble family Hästesko af Målagård survives in France only.  

Rural localities in Leningrad Oblast
Karelian Isthmus